Les Arthur was a professional rugby league footballer in the Australian competition the New South Wales Rugby League (NSWRL).

Arthur played for both the South Sydney in 1918 and the Eastern Suburbs club in the 1920 seasons.

References

Australian rugby league players
Sydney Roosters players
Year of birth missing
Year of death missing
Place of birth missing
Rugby league players from Sydney
South Sydney Rabbitohs players